Miss Ukraine 2017, the 27th edition of the Miss Ukraine pageant was held at the Palace "Ukraine" in Kyiv on 6 September 2017.  Twenty-four contestants from across Ukraine competed for the crown. The competition was hosted by Yuriy Horbunov and Kateryna Osadcha. Oleksandra Kucherenko of Dnipro crowned her successor Polina Tkach of Kyiv at the end of the event. Tkach represented Ukraine at the Miss World 2017 pageant where she placed in the top 40.

Final Result

Placements

Special Awards

Contestants

Judges 
 Vlada Litovchenko - public figure, "Miss Ukraine 1995"
 Vladimir Goryansky - People's Artist of Ukraine, actor of theater and cinema
 Alina Baikova - top model, businesswoman
 Julia Aisina - designer, founder of the brand AYSINA
 Dmitry Komarov - journalist, photographer, author and presenter of the program "The World Inside Out" on the channel 1 + 1
 Andre Tan - designer clothes, inventor of the Smart Couture style
 Alena Shoptenko - choreographer, participant of the TV show "Dancing with the Stars"
 Nikolay Tishchenko - restaurateur, TV host
 Ekaterina Kukhar - ballerina of the National Opera of Ukraine
 Elizaveta Chepel - casting director of the National Committee Miss Ukraine

References

External links

2017
2017 beauty pageants
2017 in Ukraine
September 2017 events in Ukraine